The 2004 Worcester City Council election took place on 10 June 2004 to elect members of Worcester City Council in Worcestershire, England. The whole council was up for election with boundary changes since the last election in 2003 reducing the number of seats by one. The Conservative Party stayed in overall control of the council.

Campaign
Before the election the council was composed of 18 Conservatives, 10 Labour, 4 independents, 2 Liberal Democrats, 1 independent Conservative and 1 vacant seat. Boundary changes saw the number of seats reduced from 36 to 35 for the 2004 election, meaning that the whole council would be up for election for the first time since 1976. This also meant that the number of wards was increased from 12 to 15, with new wards including Cathedral and Rainbow Hill.

All parties were hoping to make gains with the Conservatives defending their record in control of the council, which they said included having a balanced budget and keeping the council tax rise down to 2.5%. Other issues raised in the election included recycling, improving public transport, dealing with traffic congestion and keeping the streets clean.

Election result
The results saw the Conservatives achieve a majority on the council after winning 18 of the 35 seats. Labour remained on 10 seats while the Liberal Democrats gained 1 to hold 3 seats.

Ward results

References

2004 English local elections
2004
2000s in Worcestershire